Macna hampsonii is a species of snout moth in the genus Macna. It was described by Lionel de Nicéville in 1896. It is found in Burma.

References

Moths described in 1896
Pyralini